The 2021–22 CSA T20 Challenge was a Twenty20 cricket tournament that took place in South Africa during February 2022. It replaced the planned 2022 edition of the Mzansi Super League, which was cancelled due to the COVID-19 pandemic. Imperial Lions were the defending champions.

Following the conclusion of the group stage matches, Titans, Western Province, Dolphins and Rocks all progressed to the semi-finals of the tournament. In the first semi-final, Titans beat Dolphins by six wickets to advance to the final. They were joined in the final by Rocks, who beat Western Province by seven wickets in their semi-final match. In the final, Rocks beat Titans by 15 runs to win the tournament.

Background
The 2022 Mzansi Super League was scheduled to be the third edition of the Mzansi Super League (MSL) Twenty20 (T20) franchise cricket tournament in South Africa. It was originally scheduled to be held in November 2020, but was postponed until 2021 due to the COVID-19 pandemic. Two new teams were announced to be participating in the 2022 MSL season. However, in October 2021, five of the six previous teams were replaced by some of the teams from 2021–22 CSA Provincial T20 Knock-Out, after Cricket South Africa restructured its domestic setup.

In December 2021, Cricket South Africa confirmed that the 2022 MSL tournament had been cancelled due to COVID-19 concerns.

Squads
The following squads were announced for the tournament.

Points table

 Advanced to the Finals

Fixtures
On 1 February 2022, Cricket South Africa confirmed all the fixtures for the tournament, with all the matches taking place at St George's Park in Port Elizabeth.

Round-robin

Finals

References

External links
 Series home at ESPN Cricinfo

CSA T20 Challenge
CSA T20 Challenge
2021–22 South African cricket season